The Too Tall Bandit is an unidentified serial bank robber who is thought to be responsible for at least sixteen bank robberies in North Carolina, South Carolina, and Tennessee dating back to 2009. His nickname is derived from his height, which is estimated to be between 6'0 and 6'8 (183 – 203 centimeters).

Robberies 
In every robbery, the bandit was heavily disguised in a mask, coat, and sometimes gloves. He would enter the banks when they were about to close, walk behind or jump over the counter, and threaten the employees with a black handgun, which he held in his right hand. He then demanded that the employees help him put money from the vault or teller drawers into his bag or backpack. He asked the employees to point out bait money and dye packs, two security measures which could be used by law-enforcement to track him down. Then, he orders the workers to lie on the floor as he flees the scene.

The perpetrator usually robs banks in rural areas near forests. The bandit has never been seen using a getaway vehicle either, so authorities believe he may live near the banks he robs.

In addition to bank robberies, the bandit is also suspected of robbing the Farragut pharmacy in Farragut, Tennessee on December 18, 2014. In that case, he stole opioids instead of money.

List of Robberies

Appearance 
The too tall bandit is believed to be between 6 feet tall and 6'6 tall by the FBI. However, some witnesses have described him as being as tall as 6'8.  He also weighs between 210 and 250 pounds, and walks with a limp on his right leg. Additionally, he has a deep voice.

In every robbery, the perpetrator used a disguise to cover his face. Sometimes he used a Halloween style mask. Other times, he wore a balaclava, which exposed his brown eyes. In many of the robberies, the bandit used gloves. However, sometimes he did not, revealing his seemingly white skin color.

See also 
 Geezer Bandit
 Piggy Bank Bandit
 Wheaton Bandit

References 

Unidentified American criminals
American bank robbers
Bank robberies
American male criminals
21st-century American criminals
Year of birth missing (living people)
Crime in North Carolina
Crime in South Carolina
Crime in Tennessee